Pathunyu "Guy" Yimsomruay (born July 6, 1979) is a Thai former swimmer, who specialized in backstroke and in individual medley events. He is a single-time Olympian (2000), and a four-time medalist at the Southeast Asian Games (1997, 1999, 2001, and 2003). While studying in the United States, Yimsomruay earned four All-American and five All-ACC honors for the Virginia Cavaliers.

Career

Early years
Yimsomruay was born in Bangkok, Thailand, the son of Sayan and Sumalee Yimsomruay. He started his sporting career in an early age, as a member of Singha Swimming Club. He accepted a full scholarship to study at the Germantown Academy in Fort Washington, Pennsylvania. During his high school career, he held school records in the 100-yard butterfly (50.65) and 100-yard backstroke (50.40), and received all-league and all-section honors. Yimsomruay also competed for the national team when Thailand hosted the 1998 Asian Games, but failed to collect a single medal in the 200 m backstroke and in the 200 m individual medley.

In 1999, Yimsomruay attended the University of Virginia in Charlottesville, where he majored in sociology, and played for the Virginia Cavaliers, swimming and diving team under head coach Mark Bernardino. While swimming for the Cavaliers, he received four All-American and five All-ACC honors, and eventually helped the school's team claim a 200-yard freestyle relay title at the 2002 Atlantic Coast Conference Championships.

International career
Yimsomruay competed for Thailand in the men's 200 m individual medley at the 2000 Summer Olympics in Sydney. After winning his first gold medal at the SEA Games in Brunei, his entry time of 2:04.90 was officially accredited under a FINA B-standard. He challenged seven other swimmers in heat four, including Latvia's two-time Olympian and top favorite Valērijs Kalmikovs. He closed out the field to last place by 4.31 seconds behind winner Dean Kent of New Zealand in 2:08.38. Yimsomruay failed to advance into the semifinals, as he placed forty-third overall in the prelims.

At the 2001 Southeast Asian Games in Kuala Lumpur, Malaysia, Yimsomruay won two bronze medals each in the 200 m individual medley (2:07.38), and in the 400 m individual medley (4:32.29).

References

External links
Player bio – Virginia Cavaliers

1979 births
Living people
Pathunyu Yimsomruay
Pathunyu Yimsomruay
Swimmers at the 2000 Summer Olympics
Male backstroke swimmers
Male medley swimmers
Virginia Cavaliers men's swimmers
University of Virginia alumni
Pathunyu Yimsomruay
Southeast Asian Games medalists in swimming
Pathunyu Yimsomruay
Pathunyu Yimsomruay
Swimmers at the 1998 Asian Games
Competitors at the 1999 Southeast Asian Games
Competitors at the 2001 Southeast Asian Games
Competitors at the 2003 Southeast Asian Games
Pathunyu Yimsomruay